United Nations Security Council Resolution 1542, adopted unanimously on 30 April 2004, after receiving a report by the Secretary-General Kofi Annan, the council deplored all violations of human rights in Haiti and urged the Government of Haiti to promote and protect human rights with a State based on rule of law and independent judiciary.

The council also reiterated its call for international assistance to Haiti over the long-term, welcoming action and support by the Organization of American States (OAS), the Caribbean Community (CARICOM) and financial institutions.

Noting the situation in Haiti, the resolution established the United Nations Stabilization Mission in Haiti (MINUSTAH) called for in Resolution 1529 (2004) for an initial period of six months, with the intention to renew for further periods. In accordance with the Secretary-General's report, the council decided MINUSTAH would consist of a civilian and a military component which would cooperate with the OAS, CARICOM and other organisations.

The resolution goes on to set out the mandate of MINUSTAH in areas including providing a secure and stable environment, human rights and supporting the political process in Haiti.

The Force consists of troops from up to 17 countries including Argentina, Bolivia, Canada, Jordan, France, South Korea and the United States, and police from 41 countries including Argentina, Bangladesh, Brazil, Egypt, Russia and Spain.

Resolution 1542 was commended as an improvement on previous policing mandates due to its clarity and integration of policing into a broad rule of law framework.

See also
 2004 Haitian coup d'état
 List of United Nations Security Council Resolutions 1501 to 1600 (2003–2005)

References

External links
 
Text of the Resolution at undocs.org
MINUSTAH website

 1542
2004 in Haiti
 1542
April 2004 events